Phaphlu is a mountainous town in north-east Nepal, approximately 270 kilometres east of the Nepalese capital, Kathmandu.

See also
 Phaplu Airport

Populated places in Solukhumbu District